Picacho is an unincorporated community located in Lincoln County, New Mexico, United States. Picacho has a post office with ZIP code 88343, which opened on June 11, 1891.

References

Unincorporated communities in Lincoln County, New Mexico
Unincorporated communities in New Mexico